Yeom, also spelled as Yum, is a Korean surname.

Notable people
Yeom Shin-Bi, King Gongmin's wife and royal consort
Yeom Ki-hun, Korean football player
Yeom Dong-gyun, South Korean football goalkeeper
Yeom Hyo-seob, South Korean taekwondo practitioner
Yum Dong-kyun, South Korean boxer
Yum Jung-ah, South Korean actress

See also
Lian (surname)
Yan (surname)
Yum (disambiguation)

Korean-language surnames